Lee Seung Hyo (born 5 May 1980), is a South Korean actor. He debuted as an actor in 2006. He rose to fame as Kim Alcheon in Queen Seon Deok.

Biography 
He had military service as a sniper in Joint Security Area (JSA) from December 2000 until February 2003. He graduated from Chungju National University and is attending Chung-Ang University Graduate School of Arts, majoring in Performance & Visual Media.

Personal life 
On February 12, 2022, Lee confirmed that he will get married in Seoul on March 1, 2022. His fiancé is Jung Hye-ri, the younger sister of actor Jung Tae-woo, who is 4 years younger than him.

Filmography

Television dramas 
 Rookie Historian Goo Hae-ryung (MBC, 2019)
 Six Flying Dragons (SBS, 2015)
 Full House Take 2 (TBS/SBS Plus, 2012)
 God of War (MBC, 2012)
 Indomitable Daughters-in-Law (MBC, 2011)
 The Peak (MBC, 2011)
 Drama Special "Hair Show" (KBS2, 2011)
 Legend of the Patriots (KBS, 2010)
 Queen Seondeok (MBC, 2009)
 Two Wives  (SBS, 2009)
 Strongest Chil Woo (KBS, 2008)
 Dae Jo Yeong (KBS1, 2007)
 Drama City (KBS2, 2006)

Music videos 
 M To M –  "I'm Sorry" [from the single The Soul of Men] (2010)
  "Friends" [from the Legend of the Patriots OST] (2010)

Awards 
 2011 Asia Jewelry Awards - Ruby Award
 2009 MBC Drama Awards - Best New Actor (Queen Seondeok)

References

External links 
 
 

1980 births
Living people
South Korean male actors
South Korean male television actors